These are References for Labor unions in the United States.

To 1900
 See also History of coal mining#Coal miners and unions
 Arnold, Andrew B. Fueling the Gilded Age: Railroads, Miners, and Disorder in Pennsylvania Coal Country (2014) Excerpt and text search
 Commons, John R. History of Labour in the United States - Vol. 2  1860-1896 (1918)
 Commons, John R. "American Shoemakers, 1648-1895: A Sketch of Industrial Evolution," Quarterly Journal of Economics 24 (November, 1909), 39–83. in JSTOR
 Grob, Gerald N. Workers and Utopia: A Study of Ideological Conflict in the American Labor Movement, 1865-1900 (1961)
 John P. Hall, "The Knights of St. Crispin in Massachusetts, 1869-1878," Journal of Economic History 18 (June, 1958), p 161-175
 Laslett, John H. M. Labor and the Left: A Study of Socialist and Radical Influences in the American Labor Movement, 1881-1924 (1970)
 Mandel, Bernard. Samuel Gompers: A Biography (1963)
 Orth, Samuel P. The Armies of Labor: A Chronicle of the Organized Wage-Earners (1919) short overview manybooks.net PDF
 Voss, Kim. The Making of American Exceptionalism: The Knights of Labor and Class Formation in the Nineteenth Century (1993)]
 Weir, Robert E. Beyond Labor's Veil: The Culture of the Knights of Labor (1996)
 Bibliography of online resources on railway labor in late 19th century

Primary Sources
 Gompers, Samuel. Seventy Years of Life and Labor: An Autobiography (1925)

1900-1932
 See also History of coal mining#Coal miners and unions
 Bernstein, Irving. The Lean Years: A History of the American Worker, 1920-33 (1966)
 Brody, David. Labor in Crisis: The Steel Strike of 1919 (1965)
 Dubofsky, Melvyn  and Warren Van Tine. John L. Lewis: A Biography (1986)
 Faue, Elizabeth. Community of Suffering & Struggle: Women, Men, and the Labor Movement in Minneapolis, 1915-1945 (1991)
 Fraser, Steve. Labor Will Rule: Sidney Hillman and the Rise of American Labor (1993)
 Gordon, Colin. New Deals: Business, Labor, and Politics, 1920-1935 (1994)
 Greene, Julie . Pure and Simple Politics: The American Federation of Labor and Political Activism, 1881-1917 (1998)
 Hooker, Clarence. Life in the Shadows of the Crystal Palace, 1910-1927: Ford Workers in the Model T Era (1997)
 Laslett, John H. M. Labor and the Left: A Study of Socialist and Radical Influences in the American Labor Movement, 1881-1924 (1970)
 Karson, Marc.  American Labor Unions and Politics, 1900-1918 (1958)
 McCartin, Joseph A. ’Labor's Great War: The Struggle for Industrial Democracy and the Origins of Modern American Labor Relations, 1912-1921 (1997)
 Mandel, Bernard. Samuel Gompers: A Biography (1963)
 Meyer, Stephen. The Five Dollar Day: Labor Management and Social Control in the Ford Motor Company, 1908-1921 (1981)
 Mink, Gwendolyn. Old Labor and New Immigrants in American Political Development: Union, Party, and State, 1875-1920 (1986)
 Orth, Samuel P. The Armies of Labor: A Chronicle of the Organized Wage-Earners (1919) short overview
 Quint, Howard H. The Forging of American Socialism: Origins of the Modern Movement (1964)
 Warne, Colston E. ed. The Steel Strike of 1919 (1963), primary and secondary documents
 Zieger, Robert. Republicans and Labor, 1919-1929. (1969)

Primary Sources
 Gompers, Samuel. Seventy Years of Life and Labor: An Autobiography (1925)

1932 - 1955
 Bernstein, Irving. Turbulent Years: A History of the American Worker, 1933-1941 (1970)
 Campbell, D'Ann. "Sisterhood versus the Brotherhoods: Women in Unions" Women at War With America: Private Lives in a Patriotic Era (1984).
 Dubofsky, Melvyn and Warren Van Time John L. Lewis (1986).
 Faue, Elizabeth. Community of Suffering & Struggle: Women, Men, and the Labor Movement in Minneapolis, 1915-1945 (1991), social history
 Fraser, Steve. Labor Will Rule: Sidney Hillman and the Rise of American Labor (1993).
 Galenson, Walter. The CIO Challenge to the AFL: A History of the American Labor Movement, 1935-1941 (1960)
 Gordon, Colin. New Deals: Business, Labor, and Politics, 1920-1935 (1994)
 Jensen, Richard J. "The Causes and Cures of Unemployment in the Great Depression," Journal of Interdisciplinary History 19 (1989) p. 553-83
 Kennedy, David M. Freedom From Fear: The American People in Depression and War, 1929–1945. (1999) recent narrative.
 Lichtenstein, Nelson. Labor's War at Home: The CIO in World War II (2003)
 Miller, Sally M., and  Daniel A. Cornford eds. American Labor in the Era of World War II (1995), essays by historians, mostly on California
 Seidman; Joel. Brotherhood of Railroad Trainmen: The Internal Political Life of a National Union (1962)
 Vittoz, Stanley. New Deal Labor Policy and the American Industrial Economy (1987)
 Zieger, Robert H. The CIO, 1935-1955 (1995)

Fair Employment FEPC
 William J. Collins, "Race, Roosevelt, and Wartime Production: Fair Employment in World War II Labor Markets," American Economic Review 91:1 (March 2001), pp. 272–286
 Andrew Edmund Kersten, Race, Jobs, and the War: The FEPC in the Midwest, 1941-46 (2000)  online review
 Merl E. Reed. Seedtime for the Modern Civil Rights Movement: The President's Committee on Fair Employment Practice, 1941-1946 (1991)

Taft-Hartley and the NLRA
 Abraham, Steven E. "The Impact of the Taft-Hartley Act on the Balance of Power in Industrial Relations" American Business Law Journal Vol. 33, 1996
 Ballam, Deborah A. "The Impact of the National Labor Relations Act on the U.S. Labor Movement" American Business Law Journal, Vol. 32, 1995
 Brooks, George W., Milton Derber, David A. McCabe, Philip Taft. Interpreting the Labor Movement (1952)
 Gilbert J. Gall, The Politics of Right to Work: The Labor Federations as Special Interests, 1943-1979 (1988)
 Fred A. Hartley Jr. and Robert A. Taft. Our New National Labor Policy: The Taft-Hartley Act and the Next Steps (1948)
 Lee, R. Alton. Truman and Taft-Hartley: A Question of Mandate (1966)
 Harry A. Millis and Emily Clark Brown. From the Wagner Act to Taft-Hartley: A Study of National Labor Policy and Labor Relations (1950)

Walter Reuther and UAW

Secondary sources
 Boyle, Kevin. The UAW and the Heyday of American Liberalism, 1945-1968 (1995)
 Kornhauser, Arthur et al. When Labor Votes: A Study of Auto Workers (1956)
 Lichtenstein, Nelson. The Most Dangerous Man in Detroit: Walter Reuther and the Fate of American Labor (1995)
 Lichtenstein, Nelson and Stephen Meyer, eds. On the Line: Essays in the History of Auto Work (1989)

Primary Sources
 Christman, Henry M. ed. Walter P. Reuther: Selected Papers (1961)

Since 1955
 Fantasia, Rick, & Kim Voss. Hard Work: Remaking the American Labor Movement (2004)
 Galenson, Walter. The American Labor Movement, 1955-1995 (1996)
 Goldberg; Arthur J. AFL-CIO, Labor United (1956)
 Goldfield, Michael, and Amy Bromsen. "The Changing Landscape of US Unions in Historical and Theoretical Perspective." Annual Review of Political Science (2013) 16: 231-257.
 Leiter, Robert D. The Teamsters Union: A Study of Its Economic Impact (1957)
 Lichtenstein, Nelson. "Labour, liberalism, and the democratic party: a vexed alliance." Relations Industrielles/Industrial Relations (2011): 512-534. online
 Mort, Jo-Ann, ed. Not Your Father's Union Movement: Inside the AFL-CIO (2002)
 Rosenfeld, Jake, and Meredith Kleykamp. "Organized Labor and Racial Wage Inequality in the United States1." American Journal of Sociology  (2012) 117#5 pp: 1460-1502.
 Steier, Richard. Enough Blame to Go Around: The Labor Pains of New York City's Public Employee Unions (2014)
 Warren, Dorian T. "The American labor movement in the age of Obama: the challenges and opportunities of a racialized political economy." Perspectives on Politics (2010) 8#3 pp: 847–860.